Anthology is a greatest hits album by Scottish/American rock band Garbage, released on October 28, 2022 through Stunvolume and BMG. It is the band's third overall and second international greatest hits album. The album includes remastered versions of 35 tracks, among hit singles and fan favourites, as well as rare track "Witness to Your Love", a song recorded in 2008 for inclusion in the Give Listen Help charity compilation.

Background 
Before the release of No Gods No Masters, Garbage partnered with BMG to distribute the album through Infectious Music. BMG has since shown interest in the band's back catalogue, reissuing the band's first two albums, Garbage and Version 2.0, on vinyl in summer 2021, releasing the 20th anniversary edition of Beautiful Garbage in November, and posting the band's music videos on Apple Music throughout 2021 and 2022. In 2022, BMG suggested the band release a greatest hits album, as it had been 15 years since 2007's Absolute Garbage. The band accepted, and on September 7, a post on the band's social media hinted at the release of Anthology, a body of work celebrating three decades of music. Shortly after the post, the album started appearing on music stores and websites, revealing the track list and the October 28 release date, before being formally announced on September 21.

Anthology is the band's third overall greatest hits album, after 2007's Absolute Garbage and 2012's The Absolute Collection. However, it is their second international greatest hits album as The Absolute Collection was only released in Australia and New Zealand ahead of their Australian 2013 tour promoting Not Your Kind of People. The album includes 35 singles listed by chronological order of release, including rare track "Witness to Your Love". The compilation omits the airplay singles "Supervixen", "Temptation Waits", the Record Store Day releases from 2013 to 2018 ("Because the Night", "Girls Talk", "The Chemicals" and "Destroying Angels") and No Gods No Masters single "Wolves". "You Look So Fine" features as "Single Version", which was only released on the CD single and on the music video in 1999. No new songs feature on the album, although all the songs were remastered in 2022 by Heba Kadry. The vinyl edition features a shorter track list of 20 songs, including "Witness to Your Love". 

In 2022, singer Shirley Manson revealed Garbage had little involvement in putting Absolute Garbage together, a process she described as a "heartless experience", whereas with Anthology, the band had "the polar opposite of that experience", also being heavily involved in the art direction. Manson explained to NME that the album is not meant as a greatest hits collection, but rather something "more academic", as an opportunity to “put all our babies together as one, look at the nursery and go, ‘Wow, we raised some pretty cute kids!’” She added it's a celebration of three decades of work in the face of criticism and doubts surrounding the band's work: “that just feels like an enormous fuck you to everyone. Fuck you, whether you liked it or not. Fuck you, we’re good at what we do. Fuck you, look at that extraordinary culmination of three decades of work together.”

Album cover was realized by Chilean artist and director Javi Mi Amor, who also directed four of Garbage's music videos from No Gods No Masters. Manson explain the band decided to continue their creative partnership with Javi Mi Amor, saying: "she shares a certain kind of visual language that we really enjoy and that we feel really speaks to our kind of aesthetic." On the cover, the Japanese writing 世界中で知う九ているバンドが生んだ最高傑作 (Sekaijū de chiu kyūte iru bando ga unda saikō kessaku) translates to "A masterpiece produced by a band known all over the world".

"Witness to Your Love" 

"Witness to Your Love" was first released on the fifth volume of the Urban Outfitters and Filter Magazine charity compilation Give Listen Help in 2008, during the band's seven year hiatus from releasing studio albums. It was released as a single to promote Anthology on October 28, 2022 and will be also released on the Witness to Your Love EP on Record Store Day April 22, 2023.

Background and recording 
In 2005, after canceling the UK and European dates of their Bleed Like Me World Tour, Garbage decided to go on an indefinite hiatus. The hiatus was briefly interrupted in 2007, when the band reconvened to fulfill their contractual obligations with Geffen by releasing their greatest hits album Absolute Garbage. The band entered the studio to write new tracks for the album, including what became "Witness to Your Love". 

In 2008, Dangerbird Records co-founder and friend of the band Jeff Castelaz founded the Pablove Foundation with his wife Jo Ann Thrailkill after they discovered their 5 year old son Pablo had Wilms' tumor. That year, Urban Outfitters and Filter Magazine compiled the fifth volume of Give Listen Help, a 27-track album with contributions from various artists, to benefit the Pablove Foundation and the Children's Hospital Los Angeles helping to fight cancer in children, on sale from October 15 through January 31, 2009. As Castelaz had approached Manson for a track to include in the compilation, she wrote the lyrics of "Witness to Your Love" to unfinished tracks from the Absolute Garbage sessions. Manson finished the track with drummer Butch Vig in his GrungeIsDead home studio in Silver Lake, with guitarists Duke Erikson and Steve Marker sending guitar parts through online collaboration. Additional drums were played by Matt Walker.

Composition 
When writer Michael Pedersen asked Manson what was her favourite song inspired by friendship or grief, Manson mentioned "Witness to Your Love", a personal track dealing with the sudden death of David Williamson, the husband of Morag Williamson, one of Manson's closest friends in Scotland. Manson was inspired to write the lyrics to the song after Williamson's funeral and some of the lyrics directly reference the poem read at the memorial. The song's lyrics also mention the Edinburgh district of Canongate and Manson's episodes of shoplifting in her youth. 

In 2022, Manson further explained that the song was written as an attempt to comfort Williamson about the loss of her husband saying "I saw him. I know he existed. And he was somewhere else, but he was there. And I'm your girl, and I've got your back. And your history is my history, and our history together is something that will move forward throughout our lives. It's a joyous song in a funny way although it's based in Debby Downerisms." Vig called the song "a pretty obscure track of ours, but one of the most beautiful songs Shirl sung."

On November 21, 2009, Manson performed a live acoustic performance of the song at the Pablo Castelaz memorial at Avalon, in Hollywood, with Vig on guitar. At the event, Manson explained the song is about "acknowledging someone's life, and in doing so, acknowledging our own and how lucky we are to be alive." The performance brought Vig and Manson close and prompted them to contact the other band members to start making music again. Three weeks later, the band reconvened at The Pass in North Hollywood and wrote "Battle in Me", thus ending their hiatus.

Release and promotion 
The song was first released on the fifth volume of Give Listen Help on October 15, 2008. The compilation was sold exclusively in Urban Outfitters stores, thus the song remained a US digital only release for 14 years. In 2011, a previously unreleased acoustic version of the track was uploaded by Garbage on the media player of their Facebook page. The player has since been taken down, but the track has been leaked online.

In 2022, the song was remastered by for its inclusion in Anthology and a music video was directed and edited by Scottish filmmaker and long-time Garbage fan Bryan M. Ferguson. It was released as a digital single on October 28 worldwide, whereas Anthology was never released in the US.  

On April 22, 2023, the song will be released on the four-song 12" Witness to Your Love EP as a vinyl exclusive Record Store Day release. The song will be backed by an unreleased cover of "Cities in Dust", originally by Siouxsie and the Banshees, and two outtakes from the No Gods No Masters sessions, "Blue Betty" and "Adam and Eve".

Music video 
The music video for "Witness to Your Love" was directed by Bryan M. Ferguson and filmed in Glasgow over three days. It stars actors Maungo Pelekekae, Alasdair Scott and Sally Pritchett as three vampires, and Ferguson's wife, Vari, as a shop assistant. Ferguson wanted to "tell a story of eternal youth, dynamism and a feeling of invincibility", so he decided to turn the protagonists into "reckless bloodsuckers": the three vampires steal blood units from a hospital, go to a skatepark (The Arches DIY), shoplift Garbage CDs in a music store (Missing Records), steal a car, drink blood from a man and go dance in a nightclub before going back to sleep in coffins built from refrigerators. Throughout the video, many easter eggs referencing Garbage are featured: at the beginning, scenes from the "Push It" music video can be seen on a TV; the vampires sleep in a refrigerator with a Garbage sticker on it; at the skate park, one of the vampires has a radio with Garbage stickers; four Garbage albums can be seen in the music shop: Anthology, Garbage, Version 2.0 and Beautiful Garbage; Pelekekae wears glasses that Manson wore during the No Gods No Masters tour.

Release and promotion 
On September 7, Garbage posted a picture on their social media with artwork designed by Javi Mi Amor and a caption alluding to the imminent release of a greatest hits collection celebrating three decades of career. The same day, the pre-order of Anthology started appearing on music stores online in a double LP transparent yellow vinyl edition and a double CD digipack edition. On September 13, the pre-order of the double CD and the double LP transparent yellow vinyl appeared on the band's official website, where the vinyl was bundled with exclusive postcards. The album was formally announced on September 21 on social media, through the band's mailing list and on music websites. 

The album is currently unavailable in North America. When asked why, Manson explained the band was not at liberty to discuss what the problem is but conceded "bands are just at the mercy of those who own their rights." The band later took to their socials to clarify that Anthology will be both physically and digitally unavailable in North America because "the people that currently own the rights to our songs in North America decided that they didn’t care to release it. Despite our pleas to the contrary there was absolutely nothing we were able to do about that decision."

The compilation was announced to come out on major streaming platforms as well, although the digital release did not materialize until November 11. The band clarified with a statement on their social media that the delay was due to "rights issues and other unexpected complications". However, this digital edition did not feature the correct masters of the tracks. The digital release was ultimately corrected on November 16 with the 2022 Heba Kadry remasters.     

On September 13, Garbage's James Bond theme song "The World Is Not Enough" was released as digital single on YouTube Music featuring new artwork. The single appeared on Amazon Music and Apple Music on September 22 and on Spotify the following day. This marks the reappearance of the song on streaming platforms, since it had disappeared in 2021 when the compilation Absolute Garbage was removed from streaming platforms in territories where the band is distributed by BMG. The single was released in Australia and New Zealand a week later by Liberator Music.

On October 4, Garbage performed "The World Is Not Enough" at the Royal Albert Hall in London with the Royal Philharmonic Orchestra as part of The Sound of 007: Live at the Royal Albert Hall curated by composer David Arnold, marking the 60th anniversary of the Bond franchise. The event was made available for streaming on Prime Video on October 5. A documentary by Matt Whitecross titled The Sound of 007 featuring an interview with Garbage premiered on Prime Video the same day. 

On October 21, 2022, a "vampiric" music video for "Witness to Your Love" directed by Scottish filmmaker Bryan M. Ferguson was teased. The video premiered on October 28, the day of Anthology release.

On October 22, Garbage played at Audacy's 9th annual We Can Survive at the Hollywood Bowl in Los Angeles, their last show of the year. After the concert, Garbage went back to studio to continue writing for their eighth studio album.

Critical reception 

Emma Harrison of Clash rated the album 9/10, writing "this collection of songs serves as a fantastic reminder of Garbage’s strengths of candid and perceptive storytelling." Mark Beaumont gave the album 4.5 out of 5 stars in his review for Classic Rock, highlighting the strength of Garbage's first singles as well as their latest ones: "Garbage’s melodic panache never falters, and Manson's snaking attacks on cheating husbands, oppressive regimes and capitalist patriarchies never lose their bite". German publication Der Vinylist gave the transparent yellow double vinyl edition of the album 3.5 out of 5 stars, complimenting the track selection, the look of the vinyls and the artwork. Alf Urbschat of Monkeypress, another German publication, gave the album 8/10, praising the diversity of the tracks, the freshness of the sound and the band's skills as musicians.

Commercial performance 
Anthology placed at number 31 on the midweek's UK Albums Chart before landing at number 99 by the end of the week, the lowest position registered by a Garbage album in the UK. However, releasing only physically, it fared better on the Albums Sales Chart (peaking at number 17), on the Vinyl Albums Chart (peaking at number 18), on the Physical Albums Chart (peaking at number 16) and on the Record Store Chart (peaking at number 12).

Track listing

Charts

Release history

References 

2022 greatest hits albums
Alternative rock compilation albums
Garbage (band) compilation albums